The Timor-Leste Petroleum Fund is a sovereign wealth fund into which the surplus wealth produced by East Timor petroleum and gas income is deposited by the East Timorese government.

The fund was established in 2005 with an opening balance of $205 million. As of 31 December 2010, the capital of the fund was US$6.9 billion.

The fund signed up to the Santiago Principles on best practices for managing Sovereign Wealth Funds and joined the International Forum of Sovereign Wealth Funds. As a member it publishes how it adopts and implements the principles within its governance procedures. In December 2021 the fund had US$18.5 billion in assets under management.

Finances
Earnings of the fund were around 4% in the 5 years to July 2011. A  key  milestone  was achieved in June 2014 when the equity allocation in the fund reached 40%. The Petroleum Fund returned 3.3% in 2014, or 2.5% after inflation. The fund's end-of-year balance in 2014 was $16.5 billion.

References

Sovereign wealth funds
Economy of East Timor
Energy in East Timor
2005 establishments in East Timor